Archduke Franz Karl Joseph of Austria (17 December 1802 – 8 March 1878) was a member of the House of Habsburg-Lorraine. He was the father of two emperors: Franz Joseph I of Austria and Maximilian I of Mexico. Through his third son Karl Ludwig,  he was the grandfather of Archduke Franz Ferdinand of Austria – whose assassination sparked the hostilities that led to the outbreak of World War I – and the great-grandfather of the last Habsburg emperor Karl I.

Life

Early life and marriage

Franz Karl was born in Vienna, the third son of Emperor Francis II of the Holy Roman Emperor by his second marriage with Princess Maria Theresa from the House of Bourbon, daughter of King Ferdinand I of the Two Sicilies and Maria Carolina of Habsburg-Lorraine. On 4 November 1824 in Vienna, he married Princess Sophie of Bavaria from the House of Wittelsbach, a daughter of King Maximilian I Joseph of Bavaria by his second wife Caroline of Baden. Sophie's paternal half-sister, Caroline Augusta of Bavaria was by this time Franz Karl's stepmother, having married his thrice-widowed father in 1816. The Wittelsbachs condoned the unappealing manners of Sophie's husband in consideration of the incapability of his elder brother Ferdinand and Sophie's chance to become Austrian Empress.

Franz Karl was an unambitious and generally ineffectual man, although he was, together with his uncle Archduke Louis, a member of the Geheime Staatskonferenz council, which after the death of Emperor Francis I ruled the Austrian Empire in the stead of his mentally ill brother Ferdinand from 1835 to 1848. The decisions, however, were actually made by the Minister of State Prince Klemens Wenzel von Metternich and his rival Count Franz Anton von Kolowrat-Liebsteinsky. His wife Sophie had already transferred her ambitions, when she urged Franz Karl to renounce his claims to the throne at the time of his brother's abdication on 2 December 1848, allowing their eldest son Franz Joseph I to take the throne.

Death and burial
Archduke Franz Karl died in Vienna in 1878, six years after the death of his wife. He is buried at the Imperial Crypt at the Capuchin Church. Franz Karl was the last Habsburg whose viscera were entombed at the Ducal Crypt of St. Stephen's Cathedral and whose heart was placed at the Herzgruft of the Augustinian Church according to a centuries-long family rite.

Honours and awards
He received the following awards:

Issue

See also
 List of heirs to the Austrian throne

Ancestors

References

External links

1802 births
1878 deaths
Nobility from Vienna
House of Habsburg-Lorraine
Austrian princes
Knights of the Golden Fleece of Austria
Grand Crosses of the Order of Saint Stephen of Hungary
Recipients of the Order of St. Anna, 1st class
Recipients of the Order of the White Eagle (Russia)
Burials at the Imperial Crypt
Burials at St. Stephen's Cathedral, Vienna
Sons of emperors
Children of Francis II, Holy Roman Emperor
Sons of kings
Non-inheriting heirs presumptive